Ladywell is a tram stop on the Eccles Line of Greater Manchester's light rail Metrolink system. It is located in the Ladywell area of the City of Salford, in North West England, and opened on 12 June 1999 as part of Phase 2 of the system's expansion.

Ladywell has a Park and Ride car park for Metrolink customer which is a few minutes' walk from the end of the platforms.

The tram stop itself is named after the nearby roundabout, Ladywell roundabout, under which the tram lines are tunnelled.

Services

Service pattern
12 minute service to Ashton-under-Lyne (via MediaCityUK at offpeak times).
12 minute service to Eccles.

Connecting bus routes
Ladywell station is served by Go North West service 33, which runs between Manchester Shudehill and Worsley via Eccles and Diamond Bus North West service 20 which operates between Bolton and The Trafford Centre via Monton, Worsley and Walkden.

References

External links
Ladywell Stop Information
Ladywell area map

Tram stops in Salford
Tram stops on the Eccles to Piccadilly line